Shuri is a superheroine appearing in American comic books published by Marvel Comics. Created by writer Reginald Hudlin and artist John Romita Jr., the character first appeared in Black Panther vol. 4 #2 (May 2005). Shuri is the princess of the fictional African nation of Wakanda. She is the daughter of T'Chaka and younger sister of T'Challa, who is the king of Wakanda and the Black Panther, an earned title and rank given to the paramount chief of the nation.

As T'Challa recovers from battle wounds, Shuri is tested and found suitable for the role of Black Panther. She possesses all the enhanced abilities given to the Black Panther via an ancient Wakandan ritual, is a skilled martial artist, allowed access to extensive advanced technologies and wealth, and uses learned transmorphic capabilities.

Letitia Wright portrays the character in the Marvel Cinematic Universe films Black Panther (2018), Avengers: Infinity War (2018), Avengers: Endgame (2019), and Black Panther: Wakanda Forever (2022), starring in the latter film as the new Black Panther. Additionally, Ozioma Akagha voices two younger alternate timeline versions of the character in the Disney+ animated series What If...?

Publication history
Created by writer Reginald Hudlin and artist John Romita Jr., Shuri first appeared in Black Panther vol. 4 #2 (May 2005). The character, originally written as the princess of Wakanda and a supporting character in stories featuring her older brother, T'Challa, trains to succeed him as the Black Panther and ruler of Wakanda. After T'Challa is wounded during a battle, Shuri is given the chance to become the Black Panther and proves to be both a skilled warrior and a wise leader.

In 2018, Marvel published her first vital solo series titled Shuri, written by Nnedi Okorafor, a coming of age story which focused on Shuri dealing with her brother being absent from the throne while exploring her leadership and interests.

On July 9, 2020, Marvel and its partners at Scholastic announced a new original graphic novel starring Shuri is on the way from New York Times bestselling author Roseanne A. Brown. Details regarding plot and artist have not yet been revealed.

Fictional character biography
The princess of Wakanda, Shuri is T'Chaka's youngest child and only daughter. From a very young age, Shuri coveted the Black Panther mantle. She attempts to challenge the then-Black Panther, her uncle S'yan, for the mantle, only to discover that he had already been defeated by her older half-brother T'Challa. During an attack on Wakanda by Klaw and a group of his mercenaries, she uses the Ebony Blade to defeat the Russian Radioactive Man, killing him in the process. Because she is shell-shocked by her first kill, T'Challa promises to train her in hand-to-hand combat, enabling her to fight on her own terms should she ever need to take his place as leader of Wakanda.

While T'Challa and his wife Queen Ororo are away as members of the Fantastic Four, American battleships aligned with Erik Killmonger moved in on Wakanda. With their King away, Shuri and her advisers decide to sneak onto the ships in the night and incapacitate them. During the raid Shuri is captured by Killmonger's men and thrown in a cell. She challenges Killmonger himself to a fight but, seeing her as beneath him, he sends a group of his men to battle her. She defeats them easily and is broken out of her cell by Zuri, one of T'Challa's advisers. After T'Challa and Ororo leave the Fantastic Four and return to Wakanda, the Skrulls invade Wakanda as a part of Secret Invasion. Shuri and her uncle S'yan lead most of the Wakandan army on an assault against the invading Skrulls, while T'Challa and Ororo battle their leaders.

Prince Namor of Atlantis attempts to recruit T'Challa for the Cabal, a secret council of supervillains run by Doctor Doom. He rejects the offer but is attacked by the various members, and is left in a comatose state. Queen Ororo nominates Shuri as his successor, and she successfully completes the various trials, granting herself access to the heart-shaped herb. However, when she consumes the herb, the Wakandan Panther Goddess does not imbue her with the powers of the Black Panther, instead rejecting her due to her lifelong jealousy of her brother's mantle and her arrogance in its presence. When the powerful villain Morlun threatens to annihilate Wakanda entirely, Shuri takes on the Black Panther identity and outfit anyway, and manages to both save Wakanda and resurrect her comatose brother. Through her humble act of self-sacrifice she earns the mantle of the Black Panther, and the Panther Goddess grants her its accompanying powers.

When a now powerless T'Challa discovers that Doctor Doom infected many Wakandan officials and advisers with nanites, he goes off in search of a way to stop him, leaving Shuri as acting ruler of Wakanda. Shuri tracks down and fights Namor, trying to discover for herself what part he played in her brother's injuries. Together, T'Challa and Shuri discover that the infected Wakandans, calling themselves the Desturi, intend to stage a revolution, seizing power in Wakanda for themselves.

With Doctor Doom's Desturi successfully overthrowing the incumbent Wakandan government as seen in the Doomwar storyline, he finds himself with access to the world's largest supply of vibranium. Shuri and a re-powered T'Challa, who were able to avoid infection from Doom's nanites due to their heightened senses, remain the only Wakandans not under Doom's control. They team up with Colossus, Nightcrawler, and Wolverine of the X-Men to regain control in Wakanda. They succeed, but Doom steals a large portion of the vibranium. Shuri travels the globe, attempting to destroy Doom's criminal network and recover the stolen vibranium. Doom uses vibranium's inherent mystical qualities to take control of all processed vibranium on the planet, and Shuri and the other heroes attempt to fight and stop him. They succeed when T'Challa uses Doom's own mystical ploys against him, rendering all processed vibranium on the planet inert.

Following the war with Doom, T'Challa relocates to Hell's Kitchen so that he can better test his capabilities and re-learn what he is capable of without his usual resources, replacing Daredevil while Matt Murdock is going through a similar period of self-analysis after his time possessed as a demon and the leader of the Hand. While T'Challa intended to handle business in Hell's Kitchen on his own, he learns that New York's crime boss Wilson Fisk (Kingpin) is attempting to purchase a controlling interest in the international Bank of Wakanda, with the goal of forcing the Bank to foreclose its current debts by selling its remaining land rights so that they can be exploited for more conventional mineral wealth. While T'Challa mounts a series of attacks against Fisk's new forces with the aid of Sam Wilson and Luke Cage, Shuri infiltrates Fisk's organisation by replacing his right-hand-woman, Miyu, giving her full access to Fisk's financial databases. Shuri plants a worm in the database that exposes most of Fisk's illegal financial transactions, with a final backdoor worm that could expose and ruin what little resources Fisk has left if he ever tries to come after Wakanda again (not wanting to completely take away his money as the heroes know from experience that Fisk will come back but this way he is more focused on protecting what he has left rather than plans for revenge).

With Wakanda struggling economically as seen in the "Klaws of the Panther" storyline, Shuri travels to the Savage Land to meet with Ka-Zar and obtain a stock of natural vibranium present there. They are attacked by Klaw, who wants the vibranium for his own use. They defeat him, but a volcanic eruption caused by his sound waves covers the vibranium and renders it unobtainable. She tracks down other stockpiles in Madripoor and New York, but Klaw already has A.I.M. troops excavating both sites and fights ensue. Klaw had created a monster called M.U.S.I.C. using the vibranium, and intended to place it on an AIM space station to enslave the world. With help from various other heroes, including Wolverine, Spider-Man and Black Widow, Shuri is able to thwart his scheme.

Following Namor's attack on Wakanda during Avengers vs. X-Men, Shuri declares war on Atlantis, despite her brother's protests. The Wakandans virtually level Atlantis, leaving only a few Atlantean survivors. In retaliation for Shuri's assault on Atlantis, Namor lies to Thanos’ agents by falsely telling them that the Infinity Gems were located in Wakanda. After Wakandan troops were forced to retreat from a counterattack by Thanos’ army, Shuri learns from the Dora Milaje that T’Challa was in contact with Namor during the Wakandan/Atlantean conflict and that he allowed Namor into the Necropolis several times during the conflict. As a result, Shuri banishes T’Challa from Wakanda's capital city.

During the 2013 "Infinity" storyline, it is shown that Shuri is the head of the Wakandan School for Alternative Studies.

When Wakanda is attacked by the Cabal during the "Time Runs Out" storyline, Shuri sacrifices herself by staying behind to hold off Proxima Midnight so T'Challa can escape. Her death is later confirmed when her spirit is seen among those of the past Black Panthers.

As part of Marvel's 2015 branding All-New, All-Different Marvel, T'Challa is shown trying to revive Shuri's body. Shuri's soul had transcended to the Djalia which was a spiritual plane consisting of the entire memories of Wakanda. There Shuri trained under the tutelage of a griot spirit who had taken the form of her mother, Ramonda. As they trained the griot spirit shared the memories of not only Wakanda but also before the nation had formed. With the help of Manifold, T'Challa was able combine his technology and Manifold's bending of reality to bring Shuri's soul back to the physical plane. After her revival Shuri had been imbued with the power similar to that of the griot spirit. She had then been informed of the events taking place in her absence including the rogue Dora Milaje and the rebellion led by Tetu and Zenzi. Shuri had then set out to confront the rogue Dora Milaje and convince them to join forces with T'Challa to stop the rebellion and the march against the Golden City, which she was successful in doing. With the united power of Shuri, T'Challa, Manifold, the Dora Milaje and the forces of Wakanda, Tetu was defeated although Zenzi had escaped. As the rebellion came to an end Shuri joined Wakanda's council that had been established by T'Challa.

Powers and abilities
Shuri is a masterfully fantastic scientist, engineer, and inventor with a genius level of intellect on par with the likes of her brother T'Challa and Tony Stark. Before undergoing the trials to become the Black Panther, Shuri was an extensively trained martial artist. After the trials, like the Black Panthers before her, Shuri consumed the heart-shaped herb; this granted her enhanced speed, agility, strength, endurance and senses. Her uniform is composed of vibranium.

Through her training underneath the tutelage of a griot spirit while in the Djalia, Shuri had been imbued with new supernatural abilities that allowed her to transform her body into a flexible stone-like material which also granted her an enhanced durability that cannot be dented by normal gunfire or powerful directed energy weapons. Shuri is also capable of animorphism which allows her to transform herself and whoever she is in direct contact with into a flock of black birds or a singular large dark bird.

Shuri's training in the Djalia also imbued her with super-speed and the ability to temporarily reanimate Wakandan corpses. Reanimating Wakandan corpses takes a lot of energy from her, meaning she can do it for only a short period of time.

Reception

Accolades 

 In 2018, Screen Rant included Shuri in their "15 Most Powerful Kings And Queens In The Marvel Universe" list.
 In 2018, CBR.com ranked Shuri 23rd in their "25 Smartest Characters In The Marvel Universe" list.
 In 2019, Comicbook.com ranked Shuri 39th in their "50 Most Important Superheroes Ever" list.
 In 2019, CBR.com ranked Shuri 8th in their "10 Smartest Heroes In The Marvel Universe" list.
 In 2019, Daily Mirror ranked Shuri 9th in their "Best female superheroes of all time" list.
 In 2020, Scary Mommy included Shuri in their "Looking For A Role Model? These 195+ Marvel Female Characters Are Truly Heroic" list.
 In 2021, Screen Rant included Shuri in their "15 Smartest Characters In Marvel Comics" list.
 In 2021, CBR.com ranked Shuri 6th in their "Marvel: 10 Smartest Female Characters" list.
 In 2022, The A.V. Club ranked Shuri 34th in their "100 best Marvel characters" list.
 In 2022, Screen Rant included Shuri in their "15 Most Powerful Variants Of Black Panther In Marvel Comics" list and in their "15 Smartest Characters In Marvel Comics" list.

Literary reception

Volumes

Shuri - 2018 
According to Diamond Comic Distributors, Shuri #1 was the 65th best selling comic book in October 2018. Shuri #2 was the 96th best selling comic book in November 2018.

Chase Magnett of Comicbook.com gave Shuri #1 a grade of 4 out of 5, writing, "What Okorafor and the rest of the creative team have in store for Shuri and her revised role in Wakanda remains largely impossible to guess. A new government, supernatural changes, and her love of invention are all evoked in Shuri #1 as a presentation of a complex and questioned identity. The title of Black Panther looms large over the young heroine, but this issue makes the case for a story that can both remain part of that legacy without playing second fiddle to King T'Challa. Wherever it goes in its quest to define a rising star, the skill and strength of this team is enough to make it worth discovering issue by issue as Shuri continues." Jesse Schedeen of IGN gave Shuri #1 a grade of 7.5 out of 10, saying, "Shuri #1 provides a welcome solo spotlight for a character who's really exploded in popularity this year. It reads as a natural extension of the core Black Panther comic, one that manages to advance those story threads even as it tries to reflect those elements fans love about the MCU Shuri. It's also a clean, attractively rendered book, even if the script can be needlessly wordy at times."

Other versions
A character similar to Shuri, T'Challa's younger sister T'Channa, appeared in the Marvel Mangaverse. She turned her back on the Wakandan people, instead becoming an apprentice and later the successor of Doctor Doom.

In other media

Television
 Shuri appears in Black Panther, voiced by Kerry Washington.
 Shuri appears in Avengers Assemble, voiced by Kimberly Brooks in "The Eye of Agamotto" and by Daisy Lightfoot in subsequent episodes. She first appears in season four, Avengers: Secret Wars, as a minor character before appearing in season five, Avengers: Black Panther's Quest, in a supporting role.
 Shuri appears in Lego Marvel Super Heroes - Black Panther: Trouble in Wakanda, voiced again by Daisy Lightfoot.
 Shuri appears in Marvel Rising: Operation Shuri, voiced again by Daisy Lightfoot.

Marvel Cinematic Universe

Letitia Wright portrays Shuri in media set in the Marvel Cinematic Universe. This version is a technological genius who designs the outfits and weapons for her brother T'Challa / Black Panther and is exceptionally intelligent for her age. Additionally, she and her brother live in Wakanda's capital with their mother Ramonda. Following the death of her brother, Shuri assumes the mantle of Black Panther.

Video games
 Shuri appears as a costume for Black Panther in Marvel Heroes.
 Shuri appears as a playable character in Lego Marvel's Avengers as part of the "Black Panther" DLC pack.
 Shuri appears as a playable character in Lego Marvel Super Heroes 2, voiced by Susie Wokoma.
 The MCU incarnation of Shuri appears as a playable character in Marvel: Future Fight.
 Shuri appears as a playable character in Marvel Puzzle Quest.
 Shuri appears as a non-playable character in Marvel's Avengers, voiced by Erica Luttrell.

Novels
 Nic Stone. Shuri: A Black Panther Novel (2020) 
 Nic Stone. Shuri: The Vanished (2021)

Collected editions

References

External links
 Shuri at Marvel Wiki
 Shuri at Comic Vine
 World of Black Heroes: Black Panther-Shuri Biography

Black characters in films
Characters created by John Romita Jr.
Comics characters introduced in 2005
African superheroes
Fictional characters with superhuman durability or invulnerability
Fictional characters with superhuman senses
Fictional female engineers
Fictional inventors
Fictional necromancers
Fictional princesses
Fictional queens
Fictional female scientists
Fictional women soldiers and warriors
Jungle superheroes
Marvel Comics film characters
Marvel Comics female superheroes
Marvel Comics martial artists
Marvel Comics mutates
Marvel Comics characters who can move at superhuman speeds
Marvel Comics characters with superhuman strength
Marvel Comics scientists
Wakandans
Fictional tribal chiefs